Irena Szydłowska (28 January 1928 in Lwów, Poland – 14 August 1983 in Warsaw, Poland) is an archer from  Poland.

She competed for Poland in the 1972 Summer Olympics held in Munich, Germany in the individual event where she finished in second place.  She also finished twentieth four years later in the 1976 Summer Olympics in Montreal, Quebec,  Canada.

References
 Sports-reference

1928 births
1983 deaths
Polish female archers
Olympic archers of Poland
Olympic silver medalists for Poland
Archers at the 1972 Summer Olympics
Archers at the 1976 Summer Olympics
Sportspeople from Lviv
Olympic medalists in archery
Medalists at the 1972 Summer Olympics